Rihan may refer to:

Places
Al Rihan, village located in the southern part of Lebanon, on Al Rehan mountain in Jezzine District
Rihan, Iran (disambiguation), various places in Iran
Qatrat al-Rihan, a village in northern Syria 
Umm ar-Rihan, a Palestinian village

People
Bahaeddine Rihan (born 1979), Sudanese footballer
Rihaan Patel (born 1988), Indian filmmaker

See also
Rehan (disambiguation)
Reyhan (disambiguation)
Rihand
Rihanna (disambiguation)
Rijan (disambiguation)